Anne Bankes (1759–1778) was an English pastellist.

Born in Dorset, Bankes was the sister of Henry Bankes of Kingston Lacy. It is thought that she was taught the art of pastel by Harriet Woodley. An oil portrait of her with her mother, painted by Richard Roper, still exists in the collection at Kingston Lacy. It has been suggested that Bankes may be confused with her niece, Anne Frances Banks (1790–1864), later in life the wife of Edward Boscawen. A pastel of The Calling of Samuel, derived from a work by Joshua Reynolds, is held at Kingston Lacy.

References

1759 births
1778 deaths
18th-century English painters
18th-century English women artists
Anne
English women painters
Pastel artists
Artists from Dorset